Danka Kovinić (born 18 November 1994) is a Montenegrin professional tennis player.

On 22 February 2016, she reached a career-high singles ranking of world No. 46, and on 20 June 2016, she peaked at No. 67 in the WTA doubles rankings.

Tennis career

2010–2013: Historic WTA debut and quarterfinal
Kovinić started playing as a professional in 2010. Her first WTA Tour tournament in singles was the 2013 Budapest Grand Prix, where she became the first Montenegrin to reach the quarterfinals of a WTA event.

2015: First Grand Slam match wins, first WTA singles final and doubles title
Her first major match wins in singles came at the 2015 French Open and the 2015 US Open. In October 2015, she reached her first WTA Tour singles final at the Tianjin Open.

Her first match in doubles on the WTA Tour was at Bogotá, in April 2014. She won her first WTA Tour doubles title with Stephanie Vogt, in July 2015 at Bad Gastein.

2016: Top 50 debut
Kovinić started the season at the Auckland Open where she lost in the first round to third seed Caroline Wozniacki. In doubles, she and Barbora Strýcová reached the final which they lost to Elise Mertens and An-Sophie Mestach. At the Hobart International, Kovinić was defeated in the first round by Australian wildcard Kimberly Birrell. At the Australian Open, Kovinić made it to the second round and lost to 14th seed and two-time champion, Victoria Azarenka.

Seeded third at the Rio Open, Kovinić advanced to the quarterfinals where she was defeated by wildcard Sorana Cîrstea. Seeded seventh at the Abierto Mexicano, she lost in the second round to Christina McHale. Seeded seventh at the Monterrey Open, she was defeated in the first round by qualifier Nicole Gibbs. At the Indian Wells Open, Kovinić faced eighth seed Petra Kvitová in the second round. She pushed Kvitová to three sets but ended up losing the match. At the Miami Open, Kovinić was defeated in the second round by 24th seed Johanna Konta.

2020: Return to major tournaments
At the Australian Open, Kovinić lost in the first round to 16th seed Elise Mertens.

At the Mexican Open, she was defeated in the first round by Kateryna Bondarenko. At the Monterrey Open, she lost in the first round to top seed and eventual champion Elina Svitolina.

In August, Kovinić played at the Cincinnati Open where she was defeated in the first round of qualifying by Vera Zvonareva. At the US Open, she made it to the second round and lost to 24th seed Magda Linette.

2021: WTA 500 final

In January, she started her Australian tour at the Gippsland Trophy with a win against Tamara Zidanšek, before losing to Jeļena Ostapenko in the next round. After that, she played at the Australian Open where she lost in the first round against top seed and world No. 1, Ashleigh Barty. Her next tournament was the Phillip Island Trophy where she played against 13th seed Marie Bouzková and retired during the second set, after winning the first.
 
In March, Danka made the round of 16 at the Abierto Zapopan in Guadalajara, Mexico where she was defeated in straight sets by Lauren Davis. During the tournament, she suffered a back injury and had to pull out of Monterrey Open and Miami Open.

In April, Kovinić made it into the quarterfinals of the Charleston Open by beating third seeded Petra Kvitová in straight sets in the round of 16. It was her third victory over a player who was ranked inside top 10. In the next round, she defeated 11th seed Yulia Putintseva to reach her first WTA 500 semifinal. After that, she beat 12th seeded Ons Jabeur in straight sets, to book a place in her third career final which she lost to Veronika Kudermetova.

After that, she entered the MUSC Health Open in Charleston where she reached her second consecutive WTA semifinal by beating Viktoriya Tomova in straight sets, seventh seeded Lauren Davis in the round of 16, and Shelby Rogers in the quarterfinals. She then lost to the top seed Ons Jabeur.

2022: Historic Grand Slam third round
In January, she started her Australian tour at the Melbourne Summer Set with a straight-sets win in qualifying against Alexandra Osborne, before withdrawing due to injury in the next round. At Adelaide, she lost in the first round to Maddison Inglis, in three sets.

At the Australian Open, she won in the first round against Jang Su-jeong, before she defeated reigning US Open champion Emma Raducanu in three sets to reach the third round, her best result at a Grand Slam. In the next round, she was defeated by the former world No. 1, Simona Halep. With this result, she became the first player from Montenegro to reach the third round of a Grand Slam championship.

In Indian Wells, Kovinić beat Jil Teichmann in the first round, while in the second round she had a surprising top-10 win over seventh seed Karolína Plíšková, before losing to Ludmilla Samsonova in the third round.

At Roland Garros, she avenged her loss in Indian Wells and beat 25th seed Ludmilla Samsonova in the first round. She managed to beat Anna Karolína Schmiedlová in straight sets, before losing to top seed and world No. 1, Iga Swiatek, in the third round.

Kovinić was supposed to play at Wimbledon against Sonay Kartal in the first round, but was forced to withdraw at the very last moment, due to low back problems.

Kovinić lost in the first round of the US Open (the last professional tournament of Serena's career) to Serena Williams.

In October, she reached semifinals of the Emilia-Romagna Open by beating Océane Dodin, Jasmine Paolini and Sloane Stephens. However, she lost her semifinal match to top seed Maria Sakkari.

2023: Semifinals of ASB Classic
In January, Kovinic reached the semifinals of ASB Classic by beating Nao Hibino in straight sets in the first round. In the round of 16, she beat Lauren Davis in three sets, while in the quarterfinals she managed to beat Viktória Kužmová in straight sets. In the semifinals she lost to the number one seed Coco Gauff.

Performance timelines

Only main-draw results in WTA Tour, Grand Slam tournaments, Fed Cup/Billie Jean King Cup and Olympic Games are included in win–loss records.

Singles
Current after the 2023 Indian Wells Open.

Doubles

WTA career finals

Singles: 3 (3 runner-ups)

Doubles: 5 (1 title, 4 runner-ups)

WTA Challenger finals

Singles: 2 (2 runner-ups)

Doubles: 2 (2 runner-ups)

ITF Circuit finals

Singles: 21 (13 titles, 8 runner–ups)

Doubles: 11 (4 titles, 7 runner–ups)

Other finals

Singles

Head-to-head records

Wins over top-10 players

Notes

References

External links
 
 
 

1994 births
Living people
Montenegrin female tennis players
Sportspeople from Cetinje
Olympic tennis players of Montenegro
Tennis players at the 2016 Summer Olympics